, or  or  ( fem.), is a suffix used in a number of Indo-Aryan languages, like Hindi/Urdu, Gujarati, Bengali or Marathi.  It forms an adjectival compound from a noun or an agent noun from a verb. For example, it may indicate a person involved in some kind of activity, where they come from or what they wear, for instance:
 Dabbawala, lunch box deliverer
 Chaiwala, a boy or young man who serves tea
 Dishwalla, satellite TV installer, from "dish" for parabolic antenna
 , a rickshaw driver
 Punkawallah, the servant who keeps the punkah or fan going on hot nights
 , a cotton carder
 , a waste picker or scrap dealer
 Puncture  or puncher , a tyre repairer

For example:
Amroliwala
Mithaiwala, sweetseller

 is also used to indicate a specific object or thing among several:
 , 'the small one'
 , 'the second one'
 , 'the next one'
In British military jargon of the first half of the 20th century, a "base wallah" is someone employed at a military base, or with a job far behind the front lines.

Ian McDonald has a short story, "Sanjeev and Robotwallah" (2007), and there is a character named General Robotwallah in the 2010 novel For the Win by Cory Doctorow.

References

Suffixes
Hindi words and phrases
Hindustani language
Bengali words and phrases